Afermejan-e Olya (also Romanized as Afermejān-e ‘Olyā; also known as Afermejān-e Bālā) is a village in Reza Mahalleh Rural District, in the Central District of Rudsar County, Gilan Province, Iran. At the 2006 census, its population was 86, in 33 families.

References 

Populated places in Rudsar County